Ingo is a masculine given name in contemporary Scandinavia and Germany, and a historical name in France. It is the male version of the name Inga, used in the same region.

It means "protected by Yngvi", who is the main god for the Ingvaeones, and is probably a different name for the Germanic god Freyr.

Persons with the name Ingo
 Ingemar Johansson (1932-2009), Swedish boxer, nicknamed "Ingo"
 Ingo Anderbrügge (born 1964), German footballer
 Ingo Appelt (born 1961), German former bobsledder
 Ingo Appelt (born 1967), German comedian 
 Ingo Brigandt, Canadian philosopher
 Ingo Bodtke (born 1965), German politician
 Ingo Buding (1942-2003), German tennis player
 Ingo Giezendanner (born 1975), Swiss artist
 Ingo Hoffmann (born 1953), Brazilian former race car driver
 Ingo Maurer (1932–2019), German industrial designer
 Ingo Metzmacher (born 1957), German music conductor
 Ingo Molnár, Hungarian computer programmer
 Ingo Mörth (born 1949), Austrian sociologist
 Ingo Nugel (1976-2007), German composer of video game music
 Ingo Preminger (1911-2006), American movie producer, brother of director Otto Preminger
 Ingo Rademacher (born 1971), German-born Australian actor
 Ingo Rechenberg (born 1934), German researcher and professor currently in the field of bionics
 Ingo Renner (born c. 1939), Australian glider pilot, four-time world champion
 Ingo Schmitt, German politician
 Ingo Schulze (born 1962), German author
 Ingo Schwichtenberg (1965-1995), German rock drummer
 Ingo Simon (1875–1964), British singer and archer
 Ingo Steinhöfel (born 1967), German former weightlifter
 Ingo Steuer (born 1966), German figure skater and coach
 Ingo Swann (1933-2013), American psychic
 Ingo Titze, American vocal scientist
 Ingo Wegener (1950-2008), German computer scientist
 Ingo Wellenreuther (born 1959), German politician
 Ingo Zamperoni (born 1974), German news presenter

Fictional characters
Ingo, an associate of Talon in The Legend of Zelda series
Ingo, the missing Subway Boss in Pokémon Black and White and Pokémon Legends: Arceus 
Ingo Manfred, a main character in the Broken Sky trilogy by L. A. Weatherly.

Literature
Ingo (novel), a 2005 children's novel by Helen Dunmore

See also
Ingrid

Masculine given names
German masculine given names